Marsha Mark-Baird (born January 20, 1974 in Point Fortin) is a track and field athlete from Trinidad and Tobago, specializing in the heptathlon. She represented her nation Trinidad and Tobago in two editions of the Olympic Games (2000 and 2004), finishing twenty-second in Sydney and twenty-fifth in Athens with a then national record and her personal best score of 5962 points. Leading up to her Olympic career, Mark-Baird also picked up a silver medal in heptathlon at the 1998 Central American and Caribbean Games in Maracaibo, Venezuela.

Career
A convert to the Church of Jesus Christ of Latter-day Saints, Mark-Baird started competing in the heptathlon upon her admission to Ricks College in 1993. Two years later, she transferred to Brigham Young University in Provo, Utah on a sports scholarship, training as a member of the BYU Cougars track and field squad under the tutelage of head coach Craig Poole. While competing for the Cougars, Mark-Baird placed ninth in the heptathlon at the outdoor NCAA Championships and had contributed to a stalwart, runner-up finish for the women's track and field team at the Western Athletic Conference in San Diego, California on her junior year.

After graduating from BYU with a master's degree in social work, Mark-Baird emerged herself to be part of the world elite in heptathlon. Her first major global outing came at the 1998 Central American and Caribbean Games in Maracaibo, Venezuela, where she attained a personal record of 5706 points to take home the silver medal for Trinidad and Tobago.

Olympic Games 

On her Olympic debut in Sydney 2000, Mark-Baird became the first ever athlete from Trinidad and Tobago to compete in the heptathlon, finishing in twenty-second with 5627 points.

At the 2004 Summer Olympics in Athens, Mark-Baird qualified for her second Trinidad and Tobago team in the women's heptathlon. Leading up to her second Games, she improved her personal best score to 5934 at the track and field meeting in California during her 2004 season, that got her past the IAAF Olympic "B" standard. Mark-Baird put up a startling effort in the javelin throw to accumulate a Trinidad and Tobago record total of 5962 points, but slipped to twenty-fifth overall from her position in Sydney four years earlier.

Retirement and comeback

After the 2004 season, Mark-Baird announced her retirement from the sport to focus on both her personal life and social work endeavors. Upon watching U.S. swimmer Dara Torres and fellow sportsman and table tennis player Dexter St. Louis compete at the age of 41 in Beijing 2008, Mark-Baird sought her sights of planning an Olympic comeback. In early 2015, she began to train and compete again in heptathlon for the 2016 Summer Olympics in Rio de Janeiro.

Masters

In August 2015, Mark-Baird competed in her first World Masters Championships in Lyon, France. She earned individual gold in the W40 heptathlon and long jump, and anchored the victorious women's over-35 4 × 100 m relay with Ayanna Hutchinson, Dawnelle Stafford and Sasha Springer.

Personal life
Mark-Baird currently resides in Provo, Utah with her husband and personal manager Gregory Baird, and three of their sons, Mark, Ty, and London (whose name was linked to her Olympic comeback plans). Since her admission to college in 1993, Mark-Baird continues to serve full-time as a member of the Church of Jesus Christ of Latter-day Saints.

Personal bests

All information taken from IAAF profile.

References

External links

Profile – Best of Trinidad
BYU Cougars Athlete Bio

1974 births
Living people
Trinidad and Tobago heptathletes
Trinidad and Tobago female athletes
Olympic athletes of Trinidad and Tobago
Athletes (track and field) at the 2000 Summer Olympics
Athletes (track and field) at the 2004 Summer Olympics
Athletes (track and field) at the 1998 Commonwealth Games
People from Point Fortin
Sportspeople from Provo, Utah
Brigham Young University alumni
BYU Cougars women's track and field athletes
Central American and Caribbean Games silver medalists for Trinidad and Tobago
Competitors at the 1998 Central American and Caribbean Games
Central American and Caribbean Games medalists in athletics
Commonwealth Games competitors for Trinidad and Tobago